Autosticha xanthographa is a moth in the family Autostichidae. It was described by Edward Meyrick in 1916. It is found in Sri Lanka.

The wingspan is about 15 mm. The forewings are dark fuscous with a small basal spot of ochreous-orange suffusion. The stigmata are represented by small cloudy pale ochreous-yellowish spots, the plical beneath the first discal. There is a similar cloudy dot on the dorsum beneath the second discal and there are some pale ochreous-yellowish suffusion towards the costa before the apex, in which are two dark fuscous pre-marginal dots. There are also three pale yellowish dots on the termen. The hindwings are dark grey.

References

Moths described in 1916
Autosticha
Moths of Asia